Fireh (also Romanized as Fīreh and Firah; also known as Fīreh Delārestāq) is a village in Bala Larijan Rural District, Larijan District, Amol County, Mazandaran Province, Iran. At the 2006 census, its population was 63, in 23 families.

References 

Populated places in Amol County